John Ward House may refer to:

John Ward House (Newton, Massachusetts), a historic Federal style house
John Ward House (Salem, Massachusetts), a National Historic Landmark house, listed on the NRHP
John Ward House, Haverhill, Massachusetts, a historic house included in the Buttonwoods Museum of the Haverhill Historical Society
John Q.A. Ward House, Urbana, Ohio, listed on the National Register of Historic Places listings in Champaign County, Ohio

See also
Ward House (disambiguation)

Architectural disambiguation pages